Talk TV may refer to:

 MTV (Canada), a lifestyle and entertainment channel in Canada previously known as Talk TV
 Talk TV (Philippine TV network), a defunct all-news channel in the Philippines (2011 to 2012)
 Talk TV (Philippine TV series), a defunct talk show which premiered on ABS-CBN, in the Philippines from 2001 to 2002.
 TalkTV (British TV channel), a British news channel
 Granada Talk TV, a short-lived British daytime channel broadcast by Granada Sky Broadcasting from 1996 until 1997